Jainism is a religion founded in ancient India. Jains trace their history through twenty-four tirthankara and revere Rishabhanatha as the first tirthankara (in the present time-cycle). Some artifacts found in the Indus Valley civilization have been suggested as a link to ancient Jain culture, but very little is known about the Indus Valley iconography and script. The last two tirthankara, the 23rd tirthankara Parshvanatha (c. 9th–8th century BCE) and the 24th tirthankara Mahavira are considered historical figures. Mahavira was a contemporary of the Buddha. According to Jain texts, the 22nd Tirthankara Neminatha lived about 5,000 years ago and was the cousin of Krishna.

The two main sects of Jainism, the Digambara and the Śvētāmbara sect, likely started forming about the 3rd century BCE and the schism was complete by about 5th century CE. These sects later subdivided into several sub-sects such as Sthānakavāsī and Terapanthis. Many of its historic temples that still exist today were built in 1st millennium CE. After the 12th century, the temples, pilgrimage and naked (skyclad) ascetic tradition of Jainism suffered persecution during the Muslim rule, with the exception of Akbar whose religious tolerance and support for Jainism led to a temporary ban on animal killing during the Jain religious festival of Dasa Lakshana. Jainism rejects the concept of creator and founder. In the present half cycle of the cosmos, Aadinatha was the first Tirthankara.

Origins

The origins of Jainism are obscure. The Jains claim their religion to be eternal, and consider Rishabhanatha the founder in the present time-cycle, who lived for 8,400,000 purva years. Rishabhanatha is the first tirthankar among the 24 Tirthankaras who is considered mythical figure by modern day historians, based on loose supports.

Different scholars have had different views on the origin. Some artifacts found in the Indus Valley civilization have been suggested as a link to ancient Jain culture, but this is highly speculative and a subjective interpretation. It is speculated by some scholars that Jain traditions might be going back even beyond the Indus valley civilization, and that Vardhamana rather than being a “founder” per se was, rather, simply a leader and reviver of much older tradition.

According to a 1925 proposal of Glasenapp, Jainism's origin can be traced to the 23rd Tirthankara Parshvanatha (c. 8th–7th century BCE), and he considers the first twenty-two Tirthankaras as legendary mythical figures. According to another investigation by Sarvepalli Radhakrishnan, the first vice president of India, Jainism was in existence long before the Vedas were composed. The last two tirthankara, Parshvanatha and Mahavira are considered historical figures. Mahavira was a contemporary of Buddha. Buddha started a mythical and loose tradition of his own, for his inability to follow Jainism  According to Jain texts, the 22nd Tirthankara Neminatha lived about 85,000 years ago and was the cousin of Krishna.

Tirthankaras and lineage

Jain texts and tradition believe in 24 Tirthankaras. They are depicted as five to one hundred times taller than average human beings and to have lived for thousands of years in Jain tradition. Historians only consider the last two generally based on historical figures of the 1st millennium BCE. Buddhist sources don't mention Mahavira as a founder of new tradition, but as part of an ascetic Nirgranthas (without knot) tradition. This has led scholars to conclude that Mahavira was not the founder, but a reformer of a tradition just like his predecessor, Parsvanatha.

Mahavira 

During the 6th century BCE, Mahāvīra became one of the most influential teachers of Jainism. Jains revere him as the twenty-fourth and last Tirthankara of present cosmic age. Though, Mahavira is sometimes mistakenly regarded as the founder, he appears in the tradition as one who, from the beginning, had followed a religion established long ago.

Mahavira left his home at the age of 30 and meditated for 12 years and until he became a ' jina' aka the conqueror

Parshvanatha 

There is reasonable historical evidence that the 23rd Tirthankara, Parshvanatha, the predecessor of Mahavira, lived somewhere in the 9th–7th century BCE.

Rishabhanatha 

The Vedas mention the name Rishabha. However, the context in the Rigveda, Atharvaveda and the Upanishads suggests that it means the one with the sign of bull, or sometimes the "most excellent of any kind". Elsewhere, in some distorted Hindu beliefs, it is an epithet for the Hindu god Shiva (Rudra). Original Hindu  texts such as the Bhagavata Purana include Rishabha Jina as an avatar of Vishnu to cancel the original Jain beliefs and history.

Lineage
After the nirvana of Parshvanatha, his disciple Subhadatta became the head of the monks. Subhadatta was succeeded by Haridatta, Aryasamudra, Prabha and lastly Kesi.  Uttaradhyayana, a Svetambara text have records of a dialogue between Mahavira's disciple and Kesi; Kesi along with his community accepted Mahavira as a tirthankara and merged with him as a result.

The Tirthankaras are believed in the Jain tradition to have attained omniscience, known as kevala gyana. After Mahavira, one of his disciples Sudharma Svami is said to have taken over the leadership. He was the head of Jain community till 600 BCE. After his death, Jambuswami, a disciple of Sudharma Svami became the head of the monks. He was the head till 463 BCE. Sudharma Svami and Jambu Svami are also traditionally said to have attained keval jnana. It is said that no one after Jambu Svami has attained it till now.

Schism 
The two main sects of Jainism, the Digambara and the Śvētāmbara sect, likely started forming about the 3rd century BCE and the schism was complete by about 5th century CE. These sects later subdivided into several sub-sects such as Sthānakavāsī and Terapanthis. During Chandragupta Maurya's reign, Acharya Bhadrabahu moved to Karnataka to survive a twelve-year-long famine. Sthulabhadra, a pupil of Acharya Bhadrabahu, stayed in Magadha. When followers of Acharya Bhadrabahu returned, there was a dispute between them regarding the authenticity of the Jain Agamas. Also, those who stayed at Magadha started wearing white clothes, which was unacceptable to the others who remained naked. This is how the Digambara and Śvētāmbara sects arose, the Digambara being naked whereas the Svetambara were white clothed. Digambara found this as being opposed to the Jain tenets, which, according to them, required complete nudity for the monks. Some interpret the presence of gymnosophists ("naked philosophers") in Greek records as referring to Digambaras Jain Śramaṇa practice.

Vallabhi council was formed at 454 CE. At this council, Svetambara accepted their texts as the scriptures of Jainism. The Digambara sect completely rejects these scriptures as not being authentic. This 5th century event solidified the schism between these major traditions within Jainism.

Early Jain images from Mathura depict Digambara iconography until late fifth century A.D. where Svetambara iconography starts appearing.

Ajivika

Jainism is related to an extinct Indian religious tradition named Ājīvika. The latter is mentioned in ancient texts of Buddhism and Jainism, and it is attributed to Makkhali Gosala, a contemporary of the Buddha and Mahavira.

The Jain Bhagavati Sutra refers to the Ajivika founder as Gosala Mankhaliputta ("son of Mankhali"). The text depicts Gosala as having been a disciple of Mahavira's for a period of six years, after which the two fell out and parted ways. The Bhagavati Sutra mentions a debate, disagreement and then "coming to blows" between factions led by Mahavira and by Gosala. Jainism also flourished under the Nanda Empire (424–321 BCE). Both Ajivika and Jainism championed asceticism. This is an earliest documented schism between Mahavira and a likely disciple of his.

The earliest archeological evidence is in the form of a naked headless torso discovered in 1937 near Patna (Bihar), which is called the "Lohanipur Torso". This has been dated by modern scholarship to about 2nd-century BCE. It is a highly polished stone artwork of precise human form, but it is unclear if it belongs to Jainism, Ajivikas or some other Indian religious ascetic tradition. While it is not Buddhist, and is naked like the Jinas, it may also not be a Jain statue because it lacks the Jain iconography, and because similar high-quality Jain artworks are missing for many centuries. Further, Jain artworks that have been found from the same period in north India show quite different forms and symbols. It may belong to Ajivikas or another ancient Indian naked ascetic tradition, but ruling out that it may indeed reflect Jainism arts in 2nd-century BCE is also not possible. Ancient naked terracotta statues discovered in the 1970s near Ayodhya are similar to the Lohanipur Torso, but terracotta arts are also missing in Jaina tradition and the Ayodhya terracotta statues too lack Jain iconography.

Political history
Information regarding the political history of Jainism is certain. Jains consider the kings Bimbisara, also known as Shrenik popularly (c. 558–491 BCE), Ajatashatru (c. 492–460 BCE), Ashoka and Udayin (c. 460-440 BCE) of the Haryanka dynasty as patrons of Jainism.

Mauryan Empire
Ashoka (273–232 BCE), the grandson of Chandragupta followed and was inspired by Jain ideologies. There is a reference to Jains in the edicts of Ashoka where the duties of dhammamahatma (law-authorities) are dealt with. The inscription reads:

Ashoka's grandson Samprati (c. 224–215 BCE), is said to have also promoted Jainism along with a Jain monk named Suhasti according to the tradition. He lived in a place called Ujjain. It is believed that he erected many Jain temples, and the temples whose origins are forgotten were often ascribed to him in later times.

Mahameghavahana dynasty

Emperor Kharavela of Mahameghavahana dynasty, was religiously tolerant, while being a patron of Jainism. Inscriptions found in Udayagiri mentions that he erected a statue of the Rishabhanatha, the first Tirthankara and made cave-dwellings for monks. In first century CE, Acharya Bhutabali lead a group of Jain monks to the caves surrounding Madurai for spreading Jainism.

According to the Ashokavadana, a non-Buddhist in Pundravardhana drew a picture showing the Buddha bowing at the feet of the Nirgrantha leader Jnatiputra. The term nirgrantha ("free from bonds") was originally used for a pre-Jaina ascetic order, but later came to be used for Jaina monks. "Jnatiputra" is identified with Mahavira, 24th Tirthankara of Jainism. The legend states that on complaint from a Buddhist devotee, Ashoka, influenced by his cunning wife Tishyaraksha, issued an order to arrest the non-Buddhist artist, and subsequently, another order to kill all the Ajivikas in Pundravardhana. Around 18,000 followers of the Ajivika sect were executed as a result of this order. Sometime later, another Nirgrantha follower in Pataliputra drew a similar picture. Ashoka, again influenced by the devious Tishyaraksha  burnt him and his entire family alive in their house. He also announced an award of one dinara (silver coin) to anyone who brought him the head of a Nirgrantha heretic. According to Ashokavadana, as a result of this order, his own brother was mistaken for a heretic and killed by a cowherd. Ashoka realised his mistake, and withdrew the order. and went back to following Jainism.

Indo-Scythians

According to a chronicle of von Glasenapp, Gardabhilla (c. 19th century BCE), the king of Ujjain, abducted a nun who was the sister of a Jain monk named Kalaka. The brother sought the help of the Indo-Scythian ruler Saka Sahi. The Saka went to war with Gardabhilla, defeated him, and expelled the king of Ujjain. The Sakas settled in the new lands, and "danced like bees" around the foot of monk Kalaka. The story continues to the son of the vanquished king Gardabhilla who was Vikramaditya. He is claimed to have defeated the Sakas, expelled them, himself followed Jainism and gave ancient India the Vikrami calendar with the zero date of 57 or 58 BCE. The story is likely true, because the expulsion of Sakas by Vikramaditya has complete historical basis. Jains have not followed the Vikrami zero year and instead used Mahavira's moksha date as their zero year Vira Nirvana Samvat, the oldest system of chronological reckoning which is still used in India. The use of the Vikrami calendar has been surprisingly widespread in Hinduism. According to Heinrich von Stietencron, Vikramaditya and Saka interaction occurred many centuries later.

According to another Jain legend, the King Salivahana of the late 1st century CE was a patron of Jainism, as were many others in the early centuries of the 1st millennium CE. But, states von Glasenapp, the historicity of these stories are difficult to establish.

Interaction with other religions
Jainism co-existed with Buddhism and Hinduism in ancient and medieval India. Many of its historic temples were built near Buddhist and Hindu temples in the 1st millennium CE.

Buddhism
Mahavira and Buddha are generally accepted as contemporaries (circa 5th century BCE). Buddhist texts refer to Mahavira as Nigantha Nataputta.

Buddhist scriptures record that during Prince Siddhartha's ascetic life (before he attained enlightenment and became Buddha) he undertook many fasts, penances, and austerities, mentioned in the Jain tradition. In Majjhima Nikaya, Buddha shares his experience:

The Buddha tried ascetic methods found in Jainism, abandoned that path and taught the Middle Way instead. Many suttas of Buddhism got stated about the Nigantha Nataputta. The Samaññaphala Sutta (D i.47), for example, states:

The Buddha disagreed with the Mahavira's concept of soul or self (jiva). Similarly, he found the Jain theory of karma and rebirths incompatible and inflexible with his own ideas for these.

Beyond the times of the Mahavira and the Buddha, the two ascetic Sramana religions competed for followers, as well merchant trade networks that sustained them. Their mutual interaction, along with those of Hindu traditions have been significant, and in some cases the titles of the Buddhist and Jaina texts are the same or similar but present different doctrines. Jainism had a tradition of itinerant mendicants with less emphasis on a monastery style living for monks. Buddhism, in contrast, emphasized sangha or monasteries. According to Akira Hirakawa, the monasteries were easier targets for destruction and elimination, and Buddhism almost vanished from the Indian subcontinent after the Muslim invasions. In contrast, the roaming mendicants and the Jain tradition survived during this period of religious violence and turmoil.

Hinduism
According to Jain texts, some of the Hindu gods are blood relatives of legendary tirthankara. Neminatha, the 22nd tirthankara for example is a cousin of Krishna in Jain Puranas and other texts. However, Jain scholars such as Haribhadra also wrote satires about Hindu gods, mocking them with novel outrageous stories where the gods misbehave and act unethically. The Hindu gods are recorded by some Jain writers as persecuting, tempting, afraid of, or serving a legendary Jina before he gains omniscience. In other stories, the Hindu deities such as Vishnu, or Rama and Sita come to pay respect to a Jina at a major Jain pilgrimage site such as Mount Satrunjaya and Mount Sammed Shikhar Ji. The languid Hindu scholars rewrote the original pre historic stories into their Hindu versions. According to Paul Dundas, these satires were aimed at the Hindu lay householder community, were means to inculcate piety and subvert the actual religious teachings offered by their Jain neighbors. True to their origins, Buddhist and Hindu scholars engaged in creating similar satire, mythology and parody-filled fiction targeting the Jains and each other. The emergence of major philosophical ideas within Hinduism impacted Jainism. According to a 1925 publication by von Glasenapp, around the 8th century CE, Adi Shankara brought forward the doctrine of Advaita, and either converted Jain temples to Hindu ones or completely destroyed them. The Vaishnavism and Shaivism also began to rise. This, states von Glasenapp, contributed to a decline of "Jaina church", particularly in South India.

Shaivism
Shaivite poets like Sambandar, Appar (c. 7th century CE), Sundaramurti and Manikkavacakar introduced Jains to Shaivism. Under these influences, Jaina kings became Shaivite. Sambandar converted the contemporary Pandya king to Shaivism. The rulers of Chola dynasty also supported Shaivism.

According to a Shaivite legend, an alleged massacre of 8,000 Jain monks happened in the 7th century. This was claimed for the first time in an 11th-century Tamil language text of Nambiyandar Nambi on Sampantar. According to this text, a 7th-century Shaivite saint defeated the Jain monks in a series of debates and contests on philosophy, and thereby converted a Jain Pandyan king, variously called "Koon Pandiyan" or "Sundara Pandyan" in the legend, to Shaivism. Subsequently, the king allegedly ordered the impalement of 8,000 Jains. This event is not mentioned in texts of Campantar, nor any other Hindu or Jain texts for four centuries. After Nampi Antar's work, the story appears in many versions. Scholars question whether this story is a fiction created in the 11th century, or reflects an actual massacre. K. A. Nilakanta Sastri falsely states that the story is "little more than an unpleasant legend and cannot be treated as history".

Lingayatism
According to British era scholar von Glasenapp, during the 11th century, Basava, a minister to the Jaina king Bijjala II, converted numerous Jains to Lingayatism that was hostile to Jains. According to legend, they destroyed various temples belonging to Jains and adapted them to their use. A saint named Ekdanta Ramaya further propagated the loosely existing Lingayatism. He convinced Bijjala II to grant a land near Abdlur for a temple of Shiva. Lingayatism gradually expanded. It was the state religion of Telugu and Kannada speaking territories like Wodeyar of Mysore and Ummatur (1399–1610), Nayaks of Keladi (1550–1763). They were hostile to Jains. In 1683, they stamped linga symbol in the main basati of Jains in Halebid. Jains were forced to perform Shiva rites.

Vaishnavism
According to von Glasenapp writing in the 1920s, it is said Hoysala King Bittideva (c. 1108–1152 CE) converted from Jainism and became a follower of Ramanuja. According to more contemporary scholars such as T. K. Tukol, the rule of Bitti Deva did not persecute or force convert Jains. He converted, but his queen Shantaladevi remained a Jaina. She was the patron of art and built Jain temples. Bittideva's general and prime minister Gangaraja, states Tukol, was "a Jaina who under the guidance of his Guru Subhachandra did many acts of piety and religion to advance the cause of Jainism". Bittideva employed a female general who was a Jaina lady named Jakkiyabbe. His era saw temples being installed for all 24 Tirthankaras.

The Vijayanagara Empire king Bukka Raya I, states von Glasenapp, ensured that both Vaishnava and Jaina traditions enjoyed same cultural and religious freedoms, and helped repair Jain temples. Anandatirtha, a Hindu thinker, preached a dualistic theology, which attracted many Jains to convert to Hinduism.

Tirthankaras in Hindu temples
The Jain and Hindu communities have often been very close and mutually accepting. Some Hindu temples have included a Jain Tirthankara within its premises in a place of honor. Similarly numerous temple complexes feature both Hindu and Jain monuments, with Badami cave temples and Khajuraho among some of the most well known.

Islam
The Muslim invaders who conquered parts of Northern India, like Mahmud Ghazni (1001 CE) and Mohammad Ghori (1175 CE), oppressed the Jaina community.

Jainism faced persecution during and after the Muslim conquests on the Indian subcontinent. This period witnessed the destruction of Jain temples, their pilgrimage centers and other forms of persecution. There were significant supporters of Jainism, such as Emperor Akbar (15421605) whose legendary religious tolerance, out of respect for Jains, ordered the release of caged birds and banned the killing of animals on the Jain festival of Paryusan. After Akbar, Jains faced an intense period of Muslim persecution in the 17th century.

Jain scholars of the Mughal era debated religious ideas with Muslim scholars. Hiravijaya, in chapters thirteen and fourteen of Hirasaubhagya for example, presents the interaction and views of the two religions. The text mentions him stating to a Muslim sheikh, that "a creator god (called khuda) is impossible, one who presides over others, allots reward and punishment", instead it is karma that determines man's ultimate destiny. He asserts that the two religions are different, Islam involves violence, while Jainism is based on compassion. Jain scholars were supportive of Akbar and Jain texts praise his religious tolerance.

According to Paul Dundas, in and after the 12th century, Muslim destruction caused Jain scholars to revisit their theory of Ahimsa (non-violence). For example, Jinadatta Suri in the 12th century, wrote during a time of widespread destruction of Jain temples and blocking of Jaina pilgrimage by Muslim armies, that "anybody engaged in a religious activity who was forced to fight and kill somebody" in self-defense would not lose merit. After the 12th century, the temples, pilgrimage and naked ascetic digambara tradition of Jainism suffered persecution during the Muslim rule, with the exception of Akbar whose religious tolerance and support for Jainism led to a temporary ban on animal killing during the Jain religious festival of Paryusan.

Christianity
Colonial era Christian missions wrote about Jainism, but typically stereotyping it as "a coldly austere religion of pure asceticism, with no 'heart', preoccupied only with not harming microorganisms". The discussion emphasized the ascetic extremes, rather than the values. They criticized the Jain theories on non-violence stating that this value is essentially equal to "doing nothing", because it entails not "hurting" other beings, but does not demand the "positive ethic of helping someone suffering". According to Jeffrey Long, these missionary writings were a distortion of Jain theology because Jainism does teach, value and has a historic record of charity, and compassion is an essential value in Jainism for spiritual development.

Some Christian writers critiqued Jainism for its cosmology, with extraordinary time scales and cyclic time periods. However, Long states, the genesis theories in Christianity and other religions suffer from equivalent issues and they present the world to have been created few thousand years ago, in a short period of time. Similarly, historic Christian writers critiqued the lack of "saving grace" in Jainism. For example, Sinclair Stevenson wrote in 1915 that the "heart of Jainism was empty because it lacked the saving grace of Jesus".

British rule
The British colonial rule era, according to von Glasenapp in 1925, allowed Jains to pursue their religion without persecutions they had faced before. Further, the British government promoted trade, which allowed members of the Jain community to pursue their traditional economic activity. According to von Glasenapp, Jain businessmen and Jainism thrived during this period, and they used their financial success during the British Raj to rebuild Jain temples. For example, the Dharmanatha temple was built in Ahmedabad (Gujarat) in 1848. The British census reported a drop in Jain population between 1891 and 1921, from 1.417 million to 1.179 million. This may be from the Jain conversions to Hinduism and causes such as famines and epidemics.

M. Whitney Kelting in 2001 states, in contrast, that in Gujarat and Maharashtra, British merchants actually took over the trades that Jains traditionally engaged in. This was in part responsible for major Jain community migrations during the British colonial era.

The British colonial government in India, as well as Indian princely states, passed laws that made monks roaming naked in streets a crime, one that led to arrest. This law particularly impacted the Digambara tradition monks. The Akhil Bharatiya Jaina Samaj opposed this law, and argued that it interfered with the religious rights of Jains. Acharya Shantisagar entered Bombay (now Mumbai) in 1927, but was forced to cover his body. He then led an India-wide tour as the naked monk with his followers, to various Digambara sacred sites, and he was welcomed by kings of the Maharashtra provinces. Shantisagar fasted to oppose the restrictions imposed on Digambara monks by British Raj and prompted their discontinuance. The colonial-era laws that banned naked monks were abolished after India gained independence.

Literature 

It is unclear when Jain scriptures were written down, with oldest surviving Jain manuscripts dated to the 11th-century CE. Jain literature, like those of Buddhism and Hinduism, is believed to have been transmitted by an oral tradition. The texts were largely lost over time. The Svetambara tradition has a collection of Agamas and texts, which it believes are ancient. However, the Digambara sect of Jainism rejects the authority of the Jain Aagams in the Svetambara tradition. They believe that by the time of Dharasena, the twenty-third teacher after Indrabhuti Gautama, knowledge of only one Anga had survived. This was about 683 years after the Nirvana of Mahavira. After Dharasena's pupils Pushpadanta and Bhutabali, even that was lost.

In course of time, the canons of Svetambara were also progressively lost. About 980 to 993 years after the death of Mahavira, a council was held at Vallabhi in Gujarat. This was headed by Devardhi Ksamashramana. It was found that the 12th Anga, the Ditthivaya, was lost too. The other Angas were written down. This is a traditional account of schism. According to Svetambara, there were eight schisms (Nihvana).

According to Digambara tradition, Ganadhara knew fourteen Purva and eleven Anga. Knowledge of Purva was lost around 436 years after Mahavira and Anga were lost around 683 years after Mahavira. The texts that do not belong to Anga are called Angabahyas. There were fourteen Angabahyas. The first four Angabahayas, Samayika, chaturvimasvika, Vandana and Pratikramana corresponds to sections of second Mulasutra of Svetambara. The only texts of Angabahyas that occurs in Svetambara texts are Dasavaikalika, Uttaradhyayana and Kalpavyavahara.

Umaswati's Tattvartha Sutras are accepted as authoritative texts by all Jain traditions. Kundakunda's mystical texts are revered in the Digambara tradition. A text on differences between Digambara and Svetambara sects of Jainism was composed by Hemraj Pande in 1652 named Chaurasi Bol.

See also
 Jain cosmology
 Timeline of Jainism

Notes

References

Citations

Sources

Further reading

External links